Doruchów  is a village in Ostrzeszów County, Greater Poland Voivodeship, in west-central Poland. It is the seat of the gmina (administrative district) called Gmina Doruchów.

The village has a population of 2,400. It was the site of the 18th-century Doruchów witch trial.

Notable residents 
 Theo Harych (1903–1958), German writer

References

Villages in Ostrzeszów County